Operation Nanook was an Arctic expedition undertaken by the United States Navy in 1946.
The mission is mostly documented as cartographic in nature.

From 22 July to 5 August 1946, all activities in Operation Nanook centered on Thule; Norton Sound remained at anchor there, in North Star Bay, servicing her two PBM's. Meanwhile, Whitewood and Atule operated from North Star Bay as they conducted exercises and tests in the Smith Sound-Kane Basin area. On 5 August 1946, Norton Sound and Whitewood headed for Dundas Harbour, Nunavut and Devon Island, in order to attempt air and surface operations there. Unfortunately, the ships found the harbor iced over, with a belt of pack ice extending out three miles down the coast. The Northwind broke ice in support of Operation Nanook.

The mission
The mission was to erect a radio and weather station in Thule. It was built from wooden barracks on the Pittufik, a Greenlandish word for "the place where we tie the dogs", in a large glacier valley about two miles from the trade station North Star Bay, which the Polar explorer Knud Rasmussen built.

The station was to be operated as joint Danish/American operation, under the Danish colours and Danish supervision by a crew of twenty men, ten from each nation.

Regular weather observations were maintained as Synopsies, Pibal and Radiosonde.

The station was kept in operation until 1951 when Thule Air Base was built in the valley; the weather station was then moved to the Greenlandish settlement at North Star Bay, and renamed "Dundas", until the population was moved to Qaanaaq further north in 1953.

References

2. THULEAB.DK, The Ultimate Guide to Thule Air Base. 
https://web.archive.org/web/20040110185454/http://www.thuleab.dk/

Further reading
 Campbell, Joel B. Report of Arctic Magnetic Observations, 1946. Washington, D.C.: Dept. of Commerce, U.S. Coast & Geodetic Survey, 1946. 
 Heide, J. C. Hydrographic Report: Operation Nanook 1946. [Washington]: U.S. Navy, Hydrographic Office, 1946. 
 Hunt, Ralph W. Report of Operation Nanook. Fort Belvoir, Va: Arctic Research Section, the Engineer School, 1946. 
 Operation Nanook 52. Coast Guard Academy Alumni Association The Bulletin (Nov 1952), pages 174–177.

1946 in the United States
Arctic expeditions
Military in the Arctic
Nanook
20th century in the Arctic